The Keeneland Cup is a Grade 3 horse race for Thoroughbreds aged three and over, run in August over a distance of 1200 metres on turf at Sapporo Racecourse. It serves as a trial race for the Sprinters Stakes.

The Keeneland Cup was first run in 1996 and has held Grade 3 status since 2006. It was run at Hakodate Racecourse in 2013. The race was contested over 1000 metres until 2000.

Winners since 2006

See also
 Horse racing in Japan
 List of Japanese flat horse races

References

Turf races in Japan